Balša III or Balsha III (1387 – 28 April 1421, in Belgrade) was the fifth and last ruler of Zeta from the Balšić noble family, from April 1403 to April 1421. He was the son of Đurađ II and Jelena Lazarević.

Reign 

In April 1403, the seventeen-year-old Balša became the ruler of Zeta when his father Đurađ II died as a result of the injuries he had suffered at the Battle of Tripolje. As he was young and inexperienced, his main advisor was his mother, Jelena, a sister of the ruler of Serbia at the time, Stefan Lazarević. Under the influence of his mother, Balša reverted the order of the state religion, passing a law declaring Orthodox Christianity as the official confession of the state, while Catholicism became a tolerant confession.

Balša waged a 10-year war against Venice, the First Scutari War. In 1405, Ulcinj, Bar and Budva were seized by the Venetians. Balša then became a vassal to the Ottoman Turks. In 1409, however, Venice had purchased the rights to Dalmatia from King Ladislaus of Naples and began fighting for control of Dalmatian cities. After a huge effort, Balša seized Bar from the Venetians in 1412. Venice, pressed with difficulties, had no choice but to agree to return territories it had previously seized. In 1413 he built a church dedicated to Saint Nicholas in Praskvica Monastery. According to a chapter Balša issued in 1417 he was probably a ktitor of the Moračnik Monastery.
 
Balša had waged a new war against Venice, which was connected to the war with the Hungarians and the Turks. In 1418, he conquered Shkodër from the Venetians, but lost Budva and Luštica with its salt works. In the next year, 1419, he made an unsuccessful attempt to recapture Budva. He went to Belgrade to ask for aid from Stefan Lazarević, but never returned to Zeta. In 1421, before his death and under the influence of his mother, he passed the rule of Zeta to his uncle, Despot Stefan Lazarević.

Marriage and issue 

In 1407 Balša III married Mara, a daughter of Niketa Thopia. In his second marriage, Balša III married Bolja, a daughter of Koja Zaharia, in 1412 or at the beginning of 1413. They had two daughters, Jelena (named after Balša's mother) and Teodora. 

Jelena married Stjepan Vukčić Kosača and was mother of Queen Catherine of Bosnia and Vladislav Hercegović. In 1415 Balša's only son and the only male descendant of the still Christian branch of the Balša family died.

Annotations
Name: His full name has been written as Balša Stracimirović (last name is sometimes Balšić or Đurđević)

References

Sources

 
 
 

1387 births
1421 deaths
People of the Serbian Despotate
Balšić noble family
Lords of Zeta